The 1991 Perfect Storm, also known as The No-Name Storm (especially in the years immediately after it took place) and the Halloween Gale/Storm, was a nor'easter that absorbed Hurricane Grace, and ultimately evolved into a small unnamed hurricane itself late in its life cycle. 

The initial area of low pressure developed off the coast of Atlantic Canada on October 28. Forced southward by a ridge to its north, it reached its peak intensity as a large and powerful cyclone. The storm lashed the east coast of the United States with high waves and coastal flooding before turning to the southwest and weakening. Moving over warmer waters, the system transitioned into a subtropical cyclone before becoming a tropical storm. It executed a loop off the Mid-Atlantic states and turned toward the northeast. On November 1, the system evolved into a full-fledged hurricane, with peak sustained winds of 75 miles per hour (120 km/h), although the National Hurricane Center left it unnamed to avoid confusion amid media interest in the precursor extratropical storm. It later received the name "the Perfect Storm" (playing off the common expression) after a conversation between Boston National Weather Service forecaster Robert Case and author Sebastian Junger. The system was the twelfth and final tropical cyclone, the eighth tropical storm, and fourth hurricane in the 1991 Atlantic hurricane season. The tropical system weakened, striking Nova Scotia as a tropical storm before dissipating.

Damage from the storm totaled over $200 million (1991 USD) and thirteen people were killed in total, six of which were an outcome of the sinking of Andrea Gail. Most of the damage occurred while the storm was extratropical, after waves up to  struck the coastline from Nova Scotia to Florida and southeastward to Puerto Rico. In Massachusetts, where damage was heaviest, over 100 homes were destroyed or severely damaged. To the north, more than 100 homes were affected in Maine, including the vacation home of then-President George H. W. Bush. More than 38,000 people were left without power, and along the coast high waves inundated roads and buildings.

Meteorological history

The Perfect Storm originated from a cold front that exited the east coast of the United States. On October 28, the front spawned an extratropical low to the east of Nova Scotia. Around that time, a ridge extended from the Appalachian Mountains northeastward to Greenland, with a strong high pressure center over eastern Canada. The blocking ridge forced the extratropical low to track toward the southeast and later to the west. Hurricane Grace was swept aloft by its cold front into the warm conveyor belt circulation of the deep cyclone on October 29, with the storm completely absorbing Grace by the next day. The cyclone significantly strengthened as a result of the temperature contrast between the cold air to the northwest, and the warmth and moisture from the remnants of Grace. The low-pressure system continued deepening as it drifted toward the United States. It had an unusual retrograde motion for a nor'easter, beginning a set of meteorological circumstances that occur only once every 50 to 100 years. Most nor'easters affect New England from the southwest.

The nor'easter reached peak intensity at approximately 12:00 UTC on October 30 with its lowest pressure of 972 millibars. The interaction between the extratropical storm and the high pressure system to its north created a significant pressure gradient, which created large waves and strong winds. This became the highest recorded wave height on the Scotian Shelf, which is the oceanic shelf off the coast of Nova Scotia.

The low moved over warm waters of the Gulf Stream, where bands of convection around the center began to organize. Around this time, the system attained subtropical characteristics. On November 1, while the storm was moving in a counter-clockwise loop, a tropical cyclone had been identified at the center of the larger low. (Although these conditions are rare, Hurricane Karl during 1980 formed within a larger non-tropical weather system.)

The hurricane accelerated toward the northeast and quickly weakened back into a tropical storm. While the storm was approaching the coast, weather radars depicted curved rainbands on the western side of the system. After crossing over Prince Edward Island, the storm fully dissipated late on November 2.

Preparations and naming

For several days, weather models forecast the development of a significant storm off New England. However, the models were inadequate in forecasting coastal conditions, which in one instance failed to provide adequate warning. In addition, a post-storm assessment found an insufficient number of observation sites along the coast. On October 27, the Ocean Prediction Center noted that a "dangerous storm" would form within 36 hours, with its wording emphasizing the unusual nature of the storm. The National Weather Service likewise issued warnings for the potential storm, providing information to emergency service offices as well as the media. The public however was skeptical and did not recognize the threat. The timely warnings ultimately lowered the death toll; whereas the Perfect Storm caused 13 deaths, the blizzard of 1978 killed 99 people, and the 1938 New England hurricane killed 564 people.

From Massachusetts to Maine, thousands of people evacuated their homes and sought shelter. A state of emergency was declared for nine counties in Massachusetts, including Suffolk County, as well as two in Maine. In North Carolina, the National Weather Service offices in Hatteras and Raleigh first issued a heavy surf advisory on October 27, more than eight hours before the first reports of high waves. That same day, a coastal flood watch and later a warning was issued, along with a gale warning. The Hatteras NWS office ultimately released 19 coastal flood statements, as well as media reports explaining the threat from the wind and waves, and a state of emergency was declared for Dare County, North Carolina. The warnings and lead times in the region were described as "very good".

In Canada, the threat from the storm prompted the cancellation of ferry service from Bar Harbor, Maine, to Yarmouth, Nova Scotia, as well as from Nova Scotia to Prince Edward Island and between Nova Scotia and Newfoundland.

In its tropical cyclone report on the hurricane, the National Hurricane Center only referred to the system as "Unnamed Hurricane". The Natural Disaster Survey Report called the storm "The Halloween Nor'easter of 1991". The "perfect storm" moniker was coined by author and journalist Sebastian Junger after a conversation with NWS Boston Deputy Meteorologist Robert Case in which Case described the convergence of weather conditions as being "perfect" for the formation of such a storm.  Other National Weather Service offices were tasked with issuing warnings for this storm in lieu of the typical NHC advisories.  The OPC posted warnings on the unnamed hurricane in its High Seas Forecasts. The National Weather Service State Forecast Office in Boston issued Offshore Marine Forecasts for the storm.  Local NWS offices along the East coast covered the storm in their Coastal Waters Forecasts.

Beginning in 1950, the National Hurricane Center named officially recognized tropical storms and hurricanes. The unnamed hurricane was reported to have met all the criteria for a tropical cyclone, but it was purposefully left unnamed. This was done to avoid confusion among the media and the public, who were focusing on the damage from the initial nor'easter, as the hurricane itself was not expected to pose a major threat to land. It was the eighth nameable storm of the 1991 Atlantic hurricane season. Had the system been named instead, it would have received the name Henri, which was the next name on the 1991 list after Grace.

Impact

The Halloween Storm of 1991 left significant damage along the east coast of the United States, primarily in Massachusetts and southern New Jersey. Across seven states, damage totaled over $200 million (1991 USD). Over a three-day period, the storm lashed the northeastern United States with high waves, causing damage to beachfront properties from North Carolina to Maine. The coastal flooding damaged or destroyed hundreds of homes and businesses and closed roads and airports. In addition, high winds left about 38,000 people without power. The total without power was much less than for Hurricane Bob two months prior, and was fairly low due to little rainfall and the general lack of leaves on trees. Overall there were thirteen confirmed deaths, including six on board Andrea Gail, a swordfishing boat. The vessel departed Gloucester, Massachusetts, for the waters off Nova Scotia. Andrea Gail sank while returning to Gloucester, her debris washing ashore over the subsequent weeks. The crew of six was presumed killed after a Coast Guard search was unable to find them. The storm and the boat's sinking became the center-piece for Sebastian Junger's best-selling non-fiction book The Perfect Storm (1997), which was adapted to a major Hollywood film in 2000 as The Perfect Storm starring George Clooney.

Despite the storm's severity, it was neither the costliest nor the strongest to affect the northeastern United States. It was weakening as it made its closest approach to land, and the highest tides occurred during the neap tide, which is the time when tide ranges are minimal. The worst of the storm effects stayed offshore. Two buoys near the Massachusetts coast observed record wave heights, and one observed a record wind report. The United States Coast Guard rescued 25 people at sea at the height of the storm, including 13 people from Long Island Sound. After the helicopter had attempted a rescue in the midst of the storm, an 84-person crew on the Coast Guard Cutter Tamaroa arrived and rescued four members of the crew of five after six hours in hypothermic waters. The survivors were pilots, Major Christopher David Ruvola and Captain Graham Buschor, flight engineer Staff Sergeant James R. Mioli, and pararescue jumper Technical Sergeant John Spillane. The fifth member, pararescue jumper Technical Sergeant Arden Richard Smith, was never found. They were all featured on the show I Shouldn't Be Alive.

Following the storm's damage, President George H. W. Bush declared five counties in Maine, seven counties in Massachusetts, and Rockingham County, New Hampshire to be disaster areas. The declaration allowed for the affected residents to apply for low-interest repair loans. New Jersey governor Jim Florio requested a declaration for portions of the coastline, but the request was denied because of the funding needs of other disasters, such as Hurricane Hugo, Hurricane Bob, and the 1989 Loma Prieta earthquake. The American Red Cross opened service centers in four locations in Massachusetts to assist the storm victims by providing food, clothing, medicine, and shelter. The agency deployed five vehicles carrying cleanup units and food, and allocated $1.4 million to provide assistance to 3,000 families.

New England and Atlantic Canada
Coastal floods closed several roads, forcing hundreds of people to evacuate. Damage was worst from Cape Ann in northeastern Massachusetts to Nantucket, with over 100 homes destroyed or severely damaged at Marshfield, North Beach, and Brant Point. There were two injuries in the state, although there were no fatalities. Across Massachusetts, damage totaled in the hundreds of millions of dollars.

Significant flooding was reported in that state, along with high winds that left areas without power. A total of 49 houses were severely damaged, 2 were destroyed, and overall more than 100 were affected. In Kennebunkport, the storm blew out windows and flooded the vacation home of then-President George H. W. Bush. The home sustained significant damage to its first floor. Along the coast, damage was worse than that caused by Hurricane Bob two months prior. Across Maine, the storm left $7.9 million (1991 USD) in damage, mostly in York County. More than half of the damage total was from property damage, with the remainder to transportation, seawalls, and public facilities. Although there were no deaths, there were two injuries in the state. In neighboring New Hampshire, coastal flooding affected several towns, destroying two homes. The storm destroyed three boats and damaged a lighthouse. High waves destroyed or swept away over 50,000 lobster traps, representing $2 million in losses (1991 USD). Damage was estimated at $5.6 million (1991 USD). Further west, high winds and coastal flooding lashed the Rhode Island and Connecticut coasts, killing a man in Narragansett, Rhode Island. Winds reached  in Newport, Rhode Island, causing power outages.

Off the coast of Atlantic Canada, the storm produced very high waves, flooding a ship near Sable Island and stranding another ship. Along the coast, the waves wrecked three small boats near Tiverton, Nova Scotia, as well as nine boats in Torbay, Newfoundland and Labrador. In Nova Scotia, where the storm made landfall, precipitation reached 1.18 in (30 mm), and 20,000 people in Pictou County were left without power. The storm also caused widespread power outages in Newfoundland from its high winds, which reached 68 mph (110 km/h) near St. Lawrence. There were at least 35 traffic accidents, one fatal, in Grand Falls-Windsor due to slick roads. On October 28, prior to the nor'easter's development into a subtropical storm, a record 4.4 in (116 mm) of snowfall was recorded across Newfoundland. The storm caused no significant damage in Canada, other than these traffic accidents.

Mid-Atlantic states

In New York and northern New Jersey, the storm system left the most coastal damage since the 1944 Great Atlantic hurricane. Numerous boats were damaged or destroyed, killing two people off Staten Island. High winds swept a man off a bridge, killing him. High waves flooded the beach at Coney Island. In Sea Bright, New Jersey, waves washed over a seawall, forcing 200 people to evacuate. Further inland, the Hudson, Passaic, and Hackensack rivers experienced tidal flooding. Outside Massachusetts, damage was heaviest in southern New Jersey, where the cost was estimated at $75 million (1991 USD). Across the area, tide heights reached their highest since the 1944 hurricane, leaving severe coastal and back bay flooding and closing many roads. The storm caused significant beach erosion, with 500,000 cubic yards (382,000 cubic meters) lost in Avalon, as well as $10 million damage to the beach in Cape May. The presence of a dune system mitigated the erosion in some areas. There was damage to the Atlantic City Boardwalk. Fire Island National Seashore was affected, washing away an entire row of waterfront houses in towns like Fair Harbor. Following the storm, there was a moratorium on clamming in the state's bays, due to contaminated waters. Along the Delmarva Peninsula and Virginia Beach, there was widespread water damage to homes, including ten affected houses in the Sandbridge Beach area of Virginia Beach, Virginia.

Farther south
In North Carolina along the Outer Banks, high waves were initially caused by Hurricane Grace and later its interaction with a high pressure system. This produced gale-force winds and  waves in the town of Duck. Later, the extratropical predecessor to the unnamed hurricane produced additional high waves, causing oceanfront flooding from Cape Hatteras through the northern portions of Currituck County. Flooding was first reported on October 28, when the ocean covered a portion of North Carolina Highway 12 north of Rodanthe; the route is the primary thoroughfare in the Outer Banks. Nags Head, Kitty Hawk, and Kill Devil Hills had large portions covered with water for several blocks away from the beach. The resultant flooding damaged 525 houses and 28 businesses and destroyed two motels and a few homes. Damage was estimated at $6.7 million (1991 USD). Farther south, the storm left 14 people injured in Florida. There was minor beach erosion and flooding, which damaged two houses and destroyed the pier at Lake Worth. In some locations, beaches gained additional sand from the wave action. Two people went missing off Daytona Beach after their boat lost power. High waves destroyed a portion of State Road A1A. Damage in the state was estimated at $3 million (1991 USD). High waves also affected Bermuda, the Bahamas, and the Dominican Republic. In Puerto Rico, waves of  affected the island's north coast, which prompted 32 people to seek shelter. The waves swept a person off a large rock to his death.

See also

 North Atlantic tropical cyclone
 List of New England hurricanes
 List of Canada hurricanes
 List of Category 1 Atlantic hurricanes
 1991 Halloween blizzard
 Hurricane Juan (2003)
 Hurricane Sandy (2012)
 Tropical Storm Melissa (2019)
 Hurricane Henri (2021)
 October 2021 nor'easter – A similar nor'easter that developed into Tropical Storm Wanda several days after striking the Northeastern U.S.

References

1991 Perfect Storm
1991 Perfect Storm
1991 Perfect Storm
1991 Perfect Storm
1991 meteorology
1991 natural disasters in the United States
1991 disasters in Canada
Natural disasters in Canada
Natural disasters in Nova Scotia
October 1991 events in North America
November 1991 events in North America